Bob Joseph is a member of the Gwawa'enuk Nation, and is a hereditary chief of the Gayaxala clan. Joseph grew up in Campbell River, BC and lives in Qualicum Beach, B.C. He is an author and Indigenous relations trainer, whose book 21 Things You May Not Know About the Indian Act was the 10th best-selling Canadian book of 2019 and the 6th best-selling of 2020.

Career 
Joseph is the founder and president of Indigenous Corporate Training Inc., an Indigenous relations firm. He has been an associate professor at Royal Roads University, and a guest lecturer at other academic institutions.

Bibliography 

 21 Things You May Not Know About the Indian Act. (2018). ISBN 978-0995266520. Port Coquitlam, BC:  Indigenous Relations Press.
 Indigenous Relations Insight, Tips & Suggestions To Make Reconciliation A Reality. (2019). ISBN 978-1989025642. Port Coquitlam, BC: Indigenous Relations Press.

References 

Living people
Year of birth missing (living people)
21st-century First Nations writers
Kwakwaka'wakw people
Writers from British Columbia
21st-century Canadian non-fiction writers
21st-century Canadian male writers
Canadian male non-fiction writers